The 48th Venice Biennale, held in 1999, was an exhibition of international contemporary art, with 60 participating nations. The Venice Biennale takes place biennially in Venice, Italy. Prize winners of the 48th Biennale included: Louise Bourgeois and Bruce Naumann (lifetime achievement), Italy (best national participation), and Doug Aitken, Cai Guo-Qiang, and Shirin Neshat (International Prize).

Awards 

 Golden Lion for lifetime achievement: Louise Bourgeois and Bruce Nauman
 Golden Lion for best national participation: Italy
 International Prize: Doug Aitken, Cai Guo-Qiang, Shirin Neshat
 Special Awards: Georges Adéagbo, Eija-Liisa Ahtila, Katarzyna Kozyra, Lee Bul
 Premia Unesco for the promotion of the Arts: Ghada Amer

References

Bibliography

Further reading 

 
 
 

1999 in art
1999 in Italy
Venice Biennale exhibitions